The  Association of NHS Charities, operating as NHS Charities Together, is a federation of over 250 charitable organisations that support the devolved National Health Service (NHS),  their staff, volunteers and patients, in the United Kingdom. It acts as a collective voice for NHS charities, as well as coordinating national fundraising efforts.

The charity achieved increased prominence during the COVID-19 pandemic, when 99-year old Captain Tom Moore raised over £30 million for it, by walking laps of his garden, and releasing a single with Michael Ball, which went to number one in the UK charts.

In December 2020, the Duke and Duchess of Cambridge became joint patrons of the organisation.

References

External links 
 

Charities based in the United Kingdom
National Health Service